is a former Japanese cyclist. He competed in the team time trial at the 1964 Summer Olympics.

References

1941 births
Living people
Japanese male cyclists
Olympic cyclists of Japan
Cyclists at the 1964 Summer Olympics
Place of birth missing (living people)